Sabakzai Dam is an embankment dam on the Sawar Rud, a tributary of Zhob River, about 68 km southwest of Zhob in Balochistan, Pakistan.

The 395 m long dam is earth and rock-fill with a command area of 7300 acres. Construction began in 2004 and it was inaugurated by President Pervez Musharraf on 3 September 2007. The irrigation works are still being constructed.

See also 

 List of dams and reservoirs in Pakistan

Notes 

Dams in Balochistan, Pakistan
Embankment dams
Dams completed in 2007